"One Love" is a ska song by Bob Marley's original group The Wailers from their 1965 debut studio album The Wailing Wailers. It was rerecorded as part of the 1970 medley "All in One", which contained reggae reworkings of their early ska songs. This was released as a single and is also included on the compilation African Herbsman under the name "All in One".

The famous version of "One Love" that appears on their 1977 album Exodus was recorded in 1977 for Island Records under the title of "One Love/People Get Ready". This version credits Mayfield (as Island wanted to avoid copyright problems), and it gives co-authorship credits to both Marley and Mayfield as it contains an interpolation of The Impressions' song "People Get Ready" written by Curtis Mayfield. As the main artist, Bob Marley and his group were credited as Bob Marley and the Wailers. It was not released as a single until 16 April 1984, to promote the forthcoming greatest hits album Legend. However, the single became one of his biggest hits and has been included on many of Marley and the Wailers subsequent compilation albums. The original recording of the song does not credit Mayfield's song and is simply titled "One Love" – this is because copyright law was not enforced for Jamaican recordings at this time. The original song was published in the key of B♭ major, but it has since been transposed so it is in the key of C major.

Music videos
The first music video was a posthumous release directed by Don Letts in 1984 to accompany the Bob Marley & The Wailers compilation album, Legend. It stars young British-Jamaican boy, Jesse Lawrence, in his home on the World's End Estate, and on the King's Road dancing at the head of a large crowd of punks, locals and tourists as well as archival footage of Marley (from the "Is This Love" music video). It also features several cameo appearances including Paul McCartney, two members of Bananarama, Neville Staple of The Specials, members of the reggae groups Aswad and Musical Youth, Suggs and Chas Smash of Madness; some of the short clips in this video are also in Madness' video for their song "The Return of the Los Palmas 7". The song was also released alongside the video and gave Marley a posthumous UK hit when it reached number 5 in May 1984.

A second music video for "One Love" was produced by Marley's estate in 2014, with fans submitting video ideas through Tongal and then ultimately compiling a video of diverse contributors lip-syncing and dancing to the song.

In popular culture
 
The song has been featured in Jamaica Tourist Board television advertisements since 1994. In 2007, Stephen Marley and Richard Branson re-recorded the song in Jamaica to promote Branson's Virgin Airways flights to Jamaica.
One Love is also the title of a romantic reggae film from 2003, starring Ky-Mani Marley, one of Marley's sons.
The song appears on the film Marley & Me. When the song is heard on the radio, it inspires the character to name the dog Marley. However, according to the John Grogan book of the same name on which the film is based, Grogan and his wife chose the name after hearing another Marley song, "Is This Love", on the radio whilst deciding what to call the puppy.

Charts

Weekly charts

Year-end charts

Certifications

References

1965 songs
1977 songs
Bob Marley songs
Songs written by Bob Marley
Number-one singles in New Zealand
Christianity in music